Loogootee may refer to:

Loogootee, Illinois
Loogootee, Indiana